is a Japanese tarento and reporter. She is represented with Cent Force.

Current appearances

TV series

Radio

Former appearances

Television

Photobooks

Other

References

External links
 

Japanese entertainers
Weather presenters
1989 births
Living people
People from California
Aoyama Gakuin University alumni